Havi (Hava) Dreifuss is a professor of history at the University of Tel Aviv and head of the Center for Research on the Holocaust in Poland at Yad Vashem. She specializes in the history of the Holocaust in Poland and Polish-Jewish relations during World War II.

She received her doctorate in history from the Hebrew University of Jerusalem in 2005.

External links
 An Interview with Dr. Havi Dreifuss, The Test of Jewish Solidarity, Yad Vashem website

References 

Living people
Historians of the Holocaust
Israeli historians
Women historians
Academic staff of Tel Aviv University
Yad Vashem people
1972 births

Hebrew University of Jerusalem alumni
Israeli women academics